Oligographa is a genus of moths in the family Sphingidae, containing one species Oligographa juniperi, which is known from South Africa and Mozambique. The species is commonly known as the juniper hawk moth.

References

Sphingini
Taxa named by Walter Rothschild
Moths of Africa
Monotypic moth genera
Taxa named by Karl Jordan